Santa Maria Corteorlandini is a Baroque- style, Roman Catholic church located on a street of the same name in Lucca, region of Tuscany, Italy.

History
A church at the site was present by 1099. One of the Romanesque portals still remains on the flank. In 1580 the church was affiliated with the Clerics Regular of the Mother of God of Lucca. Decoration continued over the next century.

References

Roman Catholic churches in Lucca
Baroque architecture in Lucca
12th-century Roman Catholic church buildings in Italy
17th-century Roman Catholic church buildings in Italy